The Bassa language is a Kru language spoken by about 600,000 Bassa people in Liberia, Ivory Coast, and Sierra Leone.

Phonology

Consonants 

 /ʄ/ can be heard as a glide  intervocalically within compound words.
 /h/ only rarely occurs.

Vowels

Bassa alphabets 

It has an indigenous script, Vah, it was first popularized by Dr. Thomas Flo Lewis, who has instigated publishing of limited materials in the language from the mid-1900s through the 1930s, with its height in the 1910s and 1920s. It has been reported that the script was influenced by the Cherokee syllabary created by Sequoyah.

The script has been described as one which, "like the system long in use among the Vai, consists of a series of phonetic characters standing for syllables." In fact, however, the Vah script is alphabetic. It includes 30 consonants, seven vowels, and five tones that are indicated by dots and lines inside of each vowel.

In the 1970s the United Bible Societies (UBS) published a translation of the New Testament. June Hobley, of Liberia Inland Mission, was primarily responsible for the translation. The International Phonetic Alphabet (IPA) was used for this translation rather than the Vah script, mostly for practical reasons related to printing. Because the Bassa people had a tradition of writing, they quickly adapted to the new script, and thousands learned to read.

In 2005, UBS published the entire Bible in Bassa. The translation was sponsored by the Christian Education Foundation of Liberia, Christian Reformed World Missions, and UBS. Don Slager headed a team of translators that included Seokin Payne, Robert Glaybo, and William Boen.

The IPA has largely replaced the Vah script in publications.

Latin Bassa orthography

Letters 
 A - a - [a]
 B - be - [b]
 Ɓ - ɓe - [ɓ/ⁿb]
 C - ce - [c]
 D - de - [d]
 Đ - ɖe - [ɖ/ɺ]
 Dy - dye - [dʲ/ɲ]
 Ɛ - ɛ - [ɛ]
 E - e - [e]
 F - ef - [f]
 G - ge - [g]
 Gb - gbe - [ɡ͡b/ŋ͡m]
 Gm - gme - [g͡m]
 H - ha - [h]
 Hw - hwa - [hʷ]
 I - i - [i]
 J - je - [ɟ]
 K - ka - [k]
 Kp - kpe - [k͡p]
 M - em - [m]
 N - en - [n]
 Ny - eny - [ŋ]
 Ɔ - ɔ - [ɔ]
 O - o - [o]
 P - pe - [p]
 S - es - [s]
 T - te - [t]
 U - u - [u]
 V - ve - [v]
 W - we - [w]
 Xw - xwa - [xʷ]
 Z - ze - [z]

Other letters 
 ã - [ã]
 ẽ - [ẽ]
 ĩ - [ĩ]
 ɔ̃ - [ɔ̃]
 ũ - [ũ]

Some Bassa speakers write nasalised vowels as an, en, in, ɔn, and un.

Tones 
 á - [a˥]
 à - [a˨]
 a - [a˧]
 ă - [a˨˧]
 â - [a˥˩]

References

External links
Omniglot: Bassa alphabet
Bassa-English Dictionary
Brief Summary of Liberian Indigenous Scripts
Gbokpasom - Non-Profit

 
Languages of Liberia
Kru languages